The Society of Conservative Lawyers was founded in 1947 and is an affiliate of the Conservative Party of the United Kingdom. A leading Conservative think tank, the society also provides expert legal advice to the Conservative Front Bench and hosts debates on topical issues. Since its foundation generations of Conservative candidates have been selected from the Society's ranks.

Founding and history
Founded in 1947, the society quickly became a leading Think Tank on law and legal issues for the Party and continues to help to shape manifestos and policy.
 
Its aims and objectives are to:
 Support the Conservative and Unionist Party
 Uphold the principle of justice and democracy
 Consider and promote reforms in the law
 Act as a centre for discussion of Conservative ideas
 Provide speakers and assist in finding candidates
 Promote and assist in the publication of literature

The society has a vibrant membership of lawyers with an interest in Conservative policy and runs a regular diary of meetings and dinners with a strong political theme

Notable members
The following either are current members or have been in the past

 The Rt Hon Baroness Thatcher LG OM
 The Rt Hon Lord Brittan of Spennithorne QC
 The Rt Hon Lord Howard of Lympne QC
 The Rt Hon Lord Howe of Aberavon CH QC
 The Rt Hon Lord Kingsland TD QC DL
 The Rt Hon Lord Lyell of Markyate QC
 The Rt Hon Lord Mackay of Clashfern KT
 The Rt Hon Lord Mayhew of Twysden QC DL

Think tank
In addition to the programme of events, the Society has an active research wing. This is involved in helping the frontbench teams with legislation that is going through Parliament and policy formation. Traditionally the Chairman of Research has led the Society's thinking and in recent years other members have also published pamphlets and papers through the Society. The current Chairman of Research is Lord Sandhurst, QC.

Current administration
 President: The Rt Hon Lord Mackay of Clashfern KT
 Chairman: The Rt Hon Lord Hunt of Wirral MBE
 Executive Chairman:  Sir Bob Neill MP

Recent publications
 Access to Justice: Four Essays with a foreword by Lord Faulks QC (2011)
 A Fresh Start on Sentencing, by John Riley (October 2008)
 The Impact of the Human Rights Act on the British Constitution, by Anthony Speaight QC (May 2007)
 The Impact of the Human Rights Act on the Work of the Courts, by Edward Faulks QC and Andrew Warnock (May 2007)

NB: These and other publications are available on the Society of Conservative Lawyers website which can be found here.

See also
List of UK think tanks

References

External links
Official website

Legal organisations based in the United Kingdom
Organisations associated with the Conservative Party (UK)
1947 establishments in the United Kingdom
Organizations established in 1947
Law-related professional associations